Frank Dwight Fitzgerald (January 27, 1885 – March 16, 1939) was an American politician. He was elected as the 34th and 36th governor of Michigan  and was the only Michigan governor to die in office.

Early life
Fitzgerald was born in Grand Ledge, Michigan, the son of John Wesley Fitzgerald, a member of the Michigan State House of Representatives from Eaton County, Michigan, 1st District, 1895–1896, and Carrie G. (Foreman) Fitzgerald. He was married on June 28, 1909, to Queena M. Warner and they had one child together.  He was also the father of John W. Fitzgerald, a Michigan State Senator and justice of the Michigan Supreme Court as well as chief justice in 1982.  Fitzgerald was also the grandfather of Frank M. Fitzgerald, who was a member of the Michigan House from the 56th District 1987-1992 and 71st District 1993–1996, and the great-grandfather of John Fitzgerald, the Democratic State Representative from the 83rd District in Wyoming.  He attended Grand Ledge High School, and received further education at the Ferris Institute (now Ferris State University) in Big Rapids.

Politics
Fitzgerald entered politics in 1913, serving as clerk of the State House, as well as serving as clerk of the State Senate, a position held six years. He was also deputy secretary of state from 1919 to 1923.

Fitzgerald served as a delegate from Michigan to the 1924 Republican National Convention at which incumbent Calvin Coolidge was nominated for President.  He was a member of Michigan Republican State Central Committee, 1925–1926 and secretary of the Michigan Republican Party, 1929–30.  In 1931, he was elected Secretary of State of Michigan.  He served as a delegate to the 1932 Republican National Convention, when the convention nominated incumbent President Herbert Hoover.  Hoover ultimately lost to Franklin D. Roosevelt in the 1932 General Election.

In 1934, Fitzgerald resigned from office to run for Governor of Michigan. He was elected, defeating Democrat Arthur J. Lacy and served a full two-year term. During his term, the state budget was balanced and the consolidation of state agencies was promoted.  He was a delegate to the 1936 Republican National Convention, which nominated Alf Landon, who ultimately lost to Roosevelt in the 1936 General Election.  Later that year, Fitzgerald was defeated in his bid for re-election as governor by Democrat Frank Murphy.

Fitzgerald's son, John Warner Fitzgerald, was a Michigan State Senator and Michigan Supreme Court Justice. Fitzgerald's grandson, Frank M. Fitzgerald, served in the Michigan State House of Representatives between 1986-1998. Fitzgerald's great-grandson, John W. Fitzgerald, is a Democratic State Representative for the 83rd Michigan House District, which includes portions of the City of Grand Rapids and the City of Wyoming.

Non-consecutive election and death
Fitzgerald defeated Murphy in 1938, and joined John S. Barry as the only two people to serve non-consecutive terms as Governor of Michigan.  He suffered a heart attack after battling the flu and died in Grand Ledge at the age of fifty-four, only two and a half months after retaking office.  Fitzgerald was the only Michigan governor to die in office and was succeeded by Lieutenant Governor Luren Dickinson.

Fizgerald was a member of Freemasons, Eagles, Shriners, Knights of Pythias, Knights of the Maccabees and Odd Fellows.  He is interred at Oakwood Cemetery in Grand Ledge, Michigan. In the city of Warren, Michigan, Fitzgerald High School was named in honor of the former governor on Ryan Rd.

References

Sources
The Political Graveyard
National Governors Association

1885 births
1939 deaths
American Freemasons
People from Grand Ledge, Michigan
Republican Party governors of Michigan
Republican Party members of the Michigan House of Representatives
American Congregationalists
Ferris State University alumni
Secretaries of State of Michigan
20th-century American politicians
Burials in Michigan